"Alan Freeman Days" is a song written by Robin Gibb in 2007 as a tribute to the late Australian-British DJ Alan Freeman and released in May 2008. In 2014, it was included on Gibb's first posthumous album 50 St. Catherine's Drive.

Recorded in August 2007 at Sphere Studios in London. A live performance of the song was released on Robin Gibb - In Concert With the Danish Concert Orchestra.

Writing
While it was mainly made available as a download the song was also included on a limited number of promotional CDs, a various artist compilation "V.1 - Songs from the British Academy" from Academy Recordings, of which a handful were raffled off to fans registered to Robin Gibb's forum. 
There is also a lyric in the song "and my brother Maurice is stayin alive" as his tribute also to his late twin brother Maurice Gibb.

Personnel
Robin Gibb — vocals
Peter-John Vettese — guitar, keyboards, vocals, programming
Mark "Tufty" Evans — guitar, programming, engineer
Francesco Cameli — bass

References

Songs written by Robin Gibb
2008 songs
Robin Gibb songs
Songs about musicians
Cultural depictions of Australian men
Cultural depictions of British men
Commemoration songs